= Landlord's lien =

Personal property securing payment of rent

Landlord's lien is or was a lien at common law which a landlord would acquire over the personal property of a tenant to secure the payment of rent and other obligations under the lease. In most US jurisdictions the common law landlord's lien would no longer be available; rather, to the extent that a landlord acquired a lien like the common law landlord's lien, it would be solely pursuant to statute. Oregon and Washington are states in which landlord liens continue to be relevant. Landlords maintain the first lien in these states. This is especially relevant for retailers located in these states.
